Saw is a horror franchise created by James Wan and Leigh Whannell and distributed by Lions Gate Entertainment and Twisted Pictures. The films take place in a fictional universe that revolves around a serial killer, dubbed The Jigsaw Killer, who captures victims who he believes do not appreciate their life and puts them into traps to test their survival instinct. While starting as a film series, Saw has evolved to encompass numerous media forms including video games and comics as well as mazes and a roller coaster. According to The New York Times in October 2009, including international sales and revenue from DVDs, television and merchandise, the Saw series has taken in more than $1 billion, making it one of the highest-grossing horror franchises in history. This comprises over 28 million DVDs sold and $665 million worth of ticket sales for the first five films alone, along with various other merchandise. On July 23, 2010, the franchise was recognized by the Guinness World Records as the "Most Successful Horror Movie Series".

The series debuted on October 29, 2004 with Saw. The film was met with much financial success, which allowed the sequel, Saw II, to be created and released a year later. Subsequent sequels were released a year after the previous film, all on the Friday before Halloween. Nine films have been made in the franchise. The success of the films has influenced such products as Saw: The Video Game, which was published by Konami in 2009 and released before the sixth film. Other products include a comic book, Saw: Rebirth, which was released before the second film. The most recent products released were a second video game, which released in October 2010 and ninth film, which released in May 2021.

Films

Short film

Other media

Video games

Printed

Merchandise

Digital art

References

External links
 
Official V website 
Official VI website
Thorpe Park – home to three SAW attractions

 
Saw
Saw